48:13 is the fifth studio album by English rock band Kasabian. The album, produced by the band's leader, songwriter, guitarist, and second vocalist Sergio Pizzorno (being their first album that Pizzorno became as main producer for the band), and named after its total running time, was released in Germany on 6 June 2014 and in the UK on 9 June 2014. The album entered at number one on the UK Albums Chart in its first week of release making it the band's fourth consecutive UK number one album. The album received mixed-to-positive reviews from critics who often praised the music but criticized the lyrics. The lead single "Eez-eh" was released on 29 April 2014. The second single, "Bumblebeee", was released on 3 August 2014. The video, directed by Alex Courtes, was released in late July.

Background

On 13 November 2013, Kasabian posted a teaser video on their official YouTube channel, announcing that the band's guitarist Sergio Pizzorno had been in the studio for the previous six months working on material for the new record. In an interview with QRO magazine, the band also revealed that the album would be produced by Pizzorno, who also co-produced their 2011 album Velociraptor!.

On 28 April 2014, Pizzorno said in a statement announcing the release of 48:13, "I felt that we had the confidence to be more direct, more honest with this album. I started to strip away layers rather than to just keep adding." Kasabian vocalist Tom Meighan added, "Less is more, you know? It's direct. It is what it is. Just listen to it. We've had the confidence to lay ourselves bare. Serge has stripped it right back. It's unbelievable."

Kasabian have listed Kanye West, Joe Strummer Nirvana, Death Grips, Led Zeppelin, Rage Against the Machine and Beastie Boys as influences for the album. Musically, the album represents a return to the hip hop influenced sound of their debut album combined with the space-rock and neo-psychedelic sound of their more recent releases. 

The album contains three interlude tracks; the first, "(shiva)" leads directly into "bumblebeee"; the second, "(mortis)" features Pizzorno's grandfather Wilf Dillon reading in Latin, and the third, "(levitate)" is an Arabic-inspired track featuring Pizzorno on vocals.

48:13 is notable for being the band's only album before Meighan's departure in 2020 in which Pizzorno's lead vocal duties outweigh that of Meighan, with 5 tracks being sung by Pizzorno, 3 sung by Meighan and 3 tracks which feature both on lead vocals.

Promotion and singles

On 4 April 2014, Tom Meighan and Sergio Pizzorno appeared in East London dressed in white overalls, painting large numbers "48:13" on a wall belonging to artist and fashion designer Aitor Throup, with whom the band has previously worked on the cover art for Velociraptor! (2011) and the music video for "Switchblade Smiles". On 28 April 2014, the band announced the release of the album, and it became clear that the mural was referring to its title and artwork.

48:13 was promoted by the lead single "Eez-eh", released on 29 April 2014. A music video for the song, directed by Aitor Throup, was released onto YouTube the same day.

On 11 June 2014, Pizzorno featured alongside Pete Donaldson on his Absolute Radio show, during which full versions of "Stevie" and "Treat" were played. In support of the album, Kasabian made several appearances at festivals in Europe and Japan. The band also headlined the 2014 Glastonbury Festival, performing on the Pyramid Stage on 29 June 2014.

The second single, "Bumblebeee", described by Pizzorno as a "Beastie Boys dub with a sort of Zeppelin, Rage Against the Machine chorus", was released on 3 August 2014, with the music video, directed by Alex Courtes released on 27 July. Over two months before its release, on 29 May 2014, "Bumblebeee" was awarded Zane Lowe's Hottest Record. The B-side of the "Bumblebeee" single is "Gelfling", named after the creature of the same name from the film The Dark Crystal.

The third single, "Bow" features Pizzorno on lead vocals, their second single to do so after the 2007 single "Me Plus One". It was solely released in Italy, but received some airplay in the UK. 

The fourth single, "Stevie", was a part of the soundtrack of the game, FIFA 15, made by EA Sports.

Critical reception

48:13 received mixed reviews from music critics. At Metacritic, which assigns a normalized rating out of 100 to reviews from mainstream critics, the album received an average score of 62 based on 14 reviews, indicating "generally favourable" reviews.

Digital Spy's Lisa Wright commented that "Kasabian are not quite up to Alex Turner's level of social commentary," but concluded that "when Kasabian accept what they do best and run with it – and at least half of 48:13 stays resolutely in this spirit – they're the lairy masters of undeniably pumped-up hedonistic fun." Michael Hann of The Guardian wrote that the album is "properly exciting" and the band members "never forget that their purpose is to entertain," however, "the lyrics throughout are reliably terrible." James Hall of The Daily Telegraph wrote a scathing review of Meighan's lofty ambitions for the album, surmising that "no moulds were broken during the making of this album".

Track listing
All songs written and produced by Sergio Pizzorno, and stylized in all lowercase.

Deluxe Edition Bonus DVD
Live at Victoria Park, Leicester

Personnel

Kasabian
Tom Meighan – lead vocals
Sergio Pizzorno – vocals, guitar, synthesizers, programming
Chris Edwards – bass guitar
Ian Matthews – drums, percussion

Technical personnel
Sergio Pizzorno – production
Mark "Spike" Stent – mixing
Steve McLaughlin – engineering
Mike Marsh – mastering
Aitor Throup - design, directing

Additional musicians
Tim Carter – guitar, production, additional drum programming
Wilf Dillon – Latin reading on "(Mortis)"
Ben Kealey – Wurlitzer on "Treat", piano on "Clouds"
Gary Alesbrook – trumpet on "Stevie", "Treat" and "S.P.S."
Trevor Mires – trombone on "Stevie", "Treat" and "S.P.S."
Andrew Kinsman – saxophone on "Stevie", "Treat" and "S.P.S."
Suli Breaks – additional vocals on "Glass"
London Metropolitan Orchestra

Charts and certifications

Weekly charts

Year-end charts

Certifications

Release history

In popular culture
The song "Stevie" is part of the soundtrack for the video game FIFA 15. Lead single "Eez-eh" has been used in the British media on a number of occasions within programmes and adverts.

References

2014 albums
Albums produced by Sergio Pizzorno
Kasabian albums
Columbia Records albums
Harvest Records albums